"Star Wars Theme/Cantina Band" is a song recorded by Meco, taken from the album Star Wars and Other Galactic Funk. It hit number one on the Billboard Hot 100 on October 1, 1977, holding on to the spot for two weeks and peaked at no. 7 on the UK Singles Chart, remaining in the charts for nine weeks. The single was certified Platinum by the Recording Industry Association of America, having sold a million units.

"Star Wars Theme/Cantina Band" is one of two songs that became hits featuring music from the Star Wars movie.  The other is "Star Wars (Main Title)," which is original music from the movie soundtrack by John Williams. The song reached the Top 10 concurrently with Meco's more popular version. Meco again jousted with Williams a few months later, with both artists issuing competing versions of music from Close Encounters of the Third Kind, both reaching the US and Canadian Top 40, but with Williams' version being more successful than Meco's.

Charts

Weekly charts

Year-end charts

Certifications

See also
List of Billboard Hot 100 number-one singles of 1977
List of Cash Box Top 100 number-one singles of 1977
List of number-one singles of 1977 (Canada)

References

External links

1977 debut singles
1970s instrumentals
Billboard Hot 100 number-one singles
Cashbox number-one singles
Casablanca Records singles
RPM Top Singles number-one singles
Music of Star Wars
Millennium Records singles
RCA Records singles
Compositions by John Williams
Songs about outer space